Belchertown (previously known as Cold Spring and Belcher's Town) is a town in Hampshire County, Massachusetts, United States. It is part of the Springfield, Massachusetts Metropolitan Statistical Area. The population was 15,350 at the 2020 census. The town includes the census-designated place of Belchertown. Belchertown was formerly the home of the Belchertown State School. The land on which the school sat is, as of 2016, being redeveloped for mixed uses including residential, commercial and recreational. This includes the  Lampson Brook Farm, used for community and sustainable agriculture, outdoor recreation, and wildlife preservation.

History

The area encompassing the Town is part of a crossroads of Native trails in the Connecticut River Valley of Western Massachusetts that indigenous people traveled including the Nipmuc and Norwottuck, or Nonotuck and Nolwotogg, among others. Artifacts found in the early 20th century just south of Dwight, near Lake Metacomet, suggest, "evidence of Native American occupations in Belchertown," that began some 7,000 years ago.

In 1716, the Equivalent Lands were sold by Connecticut Colony to residents who reside in present-day Connecticut and Massachusetts. Some of these lands were granted to Jonathan Belcher, the future Royal Governor of Massachusetts.

Belchertown was first settled in 1731 and was officially incorporated in 1761 as Cold Spring, later the name was changed to Belcher's Town, and then Belchertown.

In 1816, part of Belchertown was combined with part of the town of Greenwich, Massachusetts, to form Enfield, Massachusetts.  In 1938, Enfield and Greenwich were two of the four towns that were disincorporated to make way for the Quabbin Reservoir, and the northwest part of Enfield was merged back into Belchertown.

The Belchertown State School for mentally disabled residents was located in the town for 70 years, from 1922 until its closing in 1994 amid revelations of poor conditions and inhumane treatment of its residents. The property has since been under consideration for redevelopment housing, business and agricultural use.

The University of Massachusetts in neighboring Amherst employs more Belchertown residents than any other enterprise or institution.

Belchertown's executive authority consists of a select board, which in 1964 expanded from three members to five: Belchertown Select Board, of which the name changed in 2019 from the Board of Selectmen.

Geography and transportation

According to the United States Census Bureau, the town has a total area of 55.4 square miles (143.4 km2), of which 52.7 square miles (136.6 km2) is land and 2.6 square miles (6.8 km2) (4.77%) is water. Belchertown lies along the western banks of the western branch of the Quabbin Reservoir, with the lands around that water being part of the Quabbin Reservation. The town is hilly north of the town center, the hills forming part of the former Swift River Valley, with most of the rest of the town being relatively slowly sloping plains, spotted with plenty of meadow lands. Along the Swift River, which forms the eastern border of the town, lies the Herman Covey—Swift River Wildlife Management Area. Several other brooks and ponds dot the town's landscape, with some marshy lands lying along the Broad Brook.

Belchertown lies partially along the Franklin County line to the northeast, and along the Hampden County line to the south. It is bordered by Pelham to the north, New Salem to the northeast, Ware to the east, Palmer to the southeast, Ludlow to the southwest, and Granby and Amherst to the west. The town does not share a land border with New Salem, but borders the town's territory on the Quabbin Reservoir. Most of the population is centered around the town center, with most of the town being rural-residential, especially around the smaller ponds near the villages of Dwight and North Station.

The nearest interstate to the town, Interstate 90, runs just south of the town, with exits in Ludlow and Palmer.  The exit in Ludlow can be reached along Route 21, which terminates at U.S. Route 202 west of the town common.  (Prior to the building of the Quabbin Reservoir, Route 21 extended north along North Enfield Road towards the town of Athol.) The Palmer exit can be accessed along Route 181, which links U.S. Route 20 in Palmer and Route 202 in Belchertown, where the latter turns northwards towards Pelham along the edge of the reservoir.  The town is also crossed by Route 9, the major east–west route through central Massachusetts, which heads from Ware towards Amherst, passing just north of the town center. Interstate 91 runs can be reached on Route 9 about nine miles from the Belchertown/Pelham line.

The New England Central Railroad and an abandoned line which once linked to the Massachusetts Central Railroad in Palmer pass through the town.  The NECR carries freight on the line, though north of Belchertown it was a part of the Amtrak Vermonter service between Vermont and the rest of the northeast until being rerouted through Holyoke and Greenfield in 2014. There is a private airstrip, Metropolitan Airport, in Palmer, but the nearest national air service can be reached at Bradley International Airport in Connecticut.

Demographics

As of the census of 2000, there were 12,968 people, 4,886 households, and 3,517 families residing in the town. The racial makeup of the town was 96.14% White, 0.81% Black or African American, 0.19% Native American, 0.96% Asian, 0.05% Pacific Islander, 0.55% from other races, and 1.30% from two or more races. Hispanic or Latino of any race was 1.57% of the population.

There were 4,886 households, out of which 38.8% had children under the age of 18 living with them, 59.2% were married couples living together, 9.8% had a female householder with no husband present, and 28.0% were non-families. Of all households 20.3% were made up of individuals, and 7.0% had someone living alone who was 65 years of age or older.  The average household size was 2.65 and the average family size was 3.09.

In the town, the population was spread out, with 27.3% under the age of 18, 7.1% from 18 to 24, 33.3% from 25 to 44, 23.6% from 45 to 64, and 8.8% who were 65 years of age or older.  The median age was 36 years. For every 100 females, there were 94.9 males.  For every 100 females age 18 and over, there were 91.9 males.

The median income for a household in the town was $52,467, and the median income for a family was $60,830. Males had a median income of $39,656 versus $30,909 for females. The per capita income for the town was $21,938.  About 5.1% of families and 5.9% of the population were below the poverty line, including 6.1% of those under age 18 and 4.4% of that age 65 or over.

Education

Belchertown School District:

Cold Spring Elementary School (Pre-K - K)
Swift River Elementary School (1–3)
Chestnut Hill Community School (4–6)
Jabish Middle School (7–8)
Belchertown High School (9–12)

Points of interest

 Belchertown Fair
 Belchertown Firefighters Museum
 Belchertown Public School System
 Belchertown Skate Park
 Belchertown State School
 Broad Brook Canal
 Clapp Memorial Library (Built in memory of John Francis Clapp in 1887 by two of his brothers. Clapp wished he had more resources for reading as a child and wished future generations of Belchertown residents would be able to have what he did not.)
 Dwight (village)
 Jessica's Boundless Playground
 Lake Metacomet
 Metacomet and Monadnock Trail
 Mini Fenway Park
 Quabbin Reservoir
 Robert Frost Hiking Trail
 Shelton Brothers Importers
 Skettersville Pond
 Stone House Museum
 Swift River
 Town Common
 Town Beach (Lake Arcadia)

Notable people

 Newell Snow Booth (1903–1968), United Methodist missionary (born in Belchertown)
 Elijah Coleman Bridgman (1801–1862), first American Protestant missionary appointed to China (born in Belchertown)
 Albert Levi Burt (1843–1913), founder of the book publisher A. L. Burt
 Addison G. Foster (1837–1917), US Senator (born in Belchertown)
 Gregory Gillespie (1936–2000), painter (died in Belchertown)
 Josiah Gilbert Holland (1819-1881), author, editor, novelist, poet (born at Dwight)
 Raymond Kennedy (1934–2008), novelist (spent childhood in Belchertown in the 1930s)
 Sara Tappan Doolittle Robinson (1827–1911), writer, historian, and inaugural First Lady of Kansas (born and raised in Belchertown)
 Porter Rockwell (–1878), "the Destroying Angel of Mormondom" and bodyguard of Mormon leader Joseph Smith (born in Belchertown)
 Mary F. Scranton, a Methodist Episcopal Church missionary to Korea who founded Ewha Womans University, one of the most prestigious women's schools in Asia
 Ruth Sienkiewicz-Mercer (1950–1998), disability rights activist (resident of infamous Belchertown State School in the 1960s and 1970s)
 Clinton Edgar Woods (1863–), electrical and mechanical engineer, inventor, manufacturer of automobiles (born in Belchertown)

References

External links

 Town of Belchertown, Massachusetts Official Website
 Stone House Museum, Belchertown Historical Society and Newspaper Archives

 
Populated places established in 1731
Springfield metropolitan area, Massachusetts
Towns in Hampshire County, Massachusetts
Towns in Massachusetts